NH 107A may refer to:

 National Highway 107A (India)
 New Hampshire Route 107A, United States